Rajiv Gupta may refer to:

 Rajiv Gupta (judge), former Chief Justice of Kerala, Uttarakhand and Chhattisgarh High Courts
 Rajiv Gupta (technocrat), Indian-American technology executive
 Rajiv L. Gupta, chairman of Delphi Automotive